LeGore Lake is a tarn located in the Eagle Cap Wilderness of northeastern Oregon, United States. It is the highest true lake in Oregon at  elevation. It is positioned near Twin Peaks and is accessed by a 4-mile hiking trail that ascends 4,000 feet and passes the LeGore mine, the lake's namesake.

References 

Lakes of Oregon
Lakes of Wallowa County, Oregon
Eagle Cap Wilderness